Éric Loiselet (16 November 1959 – 22 October 2016) was a French politician and a member of The Greens-Europe Écologie.  He was born in  Rennes, France.

He was a member of the Socialist Party's ecologist-green wing and first federal secretary of the PS in Haute-Marne until he joined The Greens. In 2009, he was selected to be The Greens-Europe Écologie's candidate in Champagne-Ardenne for the 2010 regional elections.

Loiselet died on 22 October 2016, aged 56.

References

1959 births
2016 deaths
French politicians